The Veterans Review and Appeal Board (VRAB) is a government of Canada agency responsible for hearing reviews and appeals by ill and injured Veterans and members of the Royal Canadian Mounted Police in relation to disability pension and award decisions by Veterans Affairs Canada. Although the Board reports to Parliament through the Minister of Veterans Affairs, the Board is an independent agency. It was created in 1995, and is governed by the Veterans Review and Appeal Board Act and the Veterans Review and Appeal Board Regulations. The board is headed by a chair and a deputy chair, who are selected from a permanent Board of 25 members and as many temporary members as deemed necessary. The head office is located in the Daniel J. MacDonald Building, Charlottetown, Prince Edward Island.

The vast majority of individuals appealing their cases to the Veterans Review and Appeal Board are represented free of charge by lawyers of Veterans Affairs Canada's semi-independent Bureau of Pensions Advocates.

List of chairs of the Veterans Review and Appeal Board and its predecessor organizations 

Chris McNeil (2018–present; Veterans Review & Appeal Board)
Thomas Jarmyn (2017 - 2018; Veterans Review & Appeal Board)
Thomas Jarmyn (Acting Chair 2015 - 2017; Veterans Review & Appeal Board)
John D. Larlee, Q.C. (2009 - 2015; Veterans Review & Appeal Board)
James MacPhee (Acting Chair Dec 2008 - April 2009; Veterans Review & Appeal Board)
Victor Marchand (2003 - 2008; Veterans Review & Appeal Board)
Victor Marchand (Acting Chair 2003; Veterans Review & Appeal Board)
Brian Chambers (1995 - 2003; Veterans Review & Appeal Board)
Twila M. Whalen (1991 - 1995; Veterans Appeal Board)
Norman A. Pinlott (1989 - 1991; Veterans Appeal Board)
Just P. Letellier, C.D. (1987 - 1989; Veterans Appeal Board)
Just P. Letellier, C.D. (1985 - 1987; Pension Review Board)
Frank Oatley Plant, Q.C. (1982 - 1985; Pension Review Board)
René N. Jutras (1971 - 1982; Pension Review Board)

References

External links
 Veterans Review and Appeal Board FAQ
 Veterans Review and Appeal Board Canada Governor-in-Council Appointments

Federal departments and agencies of Canada
Government agencies established in 1995
1995 establishments in Canada
Charlottetown